Lepiselaga is a genus of horse flies in the family Tabanidae.

Species
Lepiselaga albitarsis Macquart, 1850
Lepiselaga colombiana Fairchild, 1966
Lepiselaga crassipes (Fabricius, 1805)

References

Tabanidae
Diptera of South America
Diptera of North America
Taxa named by Pierre-Justin-Marie Macquart
Brachycera genera